The Pawnee Reservation was located on the Loup River in Platte and Nance counties in mid-central Nebraska . The Kawarakis Pawnees, the ancestors of the Chaui, Kitkehahki, and Pitahawirata Bands, settled in southeastern Nebraska in approximately 900.

After the state of Nebraska was admitted into the Union, the state government extinguished the tribe's rights to their land. It soon sold the land and used the proceeds to defray expenses to obtain lands elsewhere for the Indians. In the mid-1870s the remainder of the reservation was sold, and in 1876 the tribe was relocated to its present-day location in central Oklahoma.

The Genoa Indian Industrial School was built in 1884 in the town of Genoa, which is located on the former Pawnee Reservation lands.

See also 
 Native American tribes in Nebraska

References 

Former American Indian reservations in Nebraska
Geography of Platte County, Nebraska
Pawnee